Édouard François André (17 July 1840 – 25 October 1911) was a French horticulturalist, landscape designer, as well as a leading landscape architect of the late 19th century, famous for designing city parks and public spaces in Lithuania, Monte Carlo and Montevideo.

Biography

Born into a family of nurserymen in Bourges, Cher,  Édouard André assisted Jean-Pierre Barillet-Deschamps in 1860, at the age of twenty, and participated in the redesign of the city of Paris in cooperation with Jean-Charles Adolphe Alphand and Georges-Eugène Haussmann. Eventually he was appointed Head Gardener (Jardinier Principal) of Paris. During eight years of public service he designed and planted many public spaces, including the Parc des Buttes Chaumont and Tuileries Gardens.

His international career was launched in 1866, when he won the competition to design Sefton Park in Liverpool. During his life André designed around a hundred public and private landscape parks, mainly in Europe: the Russian Empire, Austria-Hungary, Switzerland, the Netherlands,  Denmark and Bulgaria (the Euxinograd palace park). Among the most famous of them in addition to Sefton Park, Liverpool, are the Luxembourg Castle Park, Funchal Garden in Madeira, Portugal, Weldham Castle Garden in Markelo, Netherlands, public park of Cognac, France and the Villa Borghese gardens, the major public park in Rome. His experience in designing public parks was distilled in Traité général de la composition des parcs et jardins, (Masson, Paris) 1879.

The private parks designed by André include four landscape parks in Lithuania established in Tyszkiewicz nobles' residences: Lentvaris, Trakų Vokė (now in Paneriai elderate of Vilnius city municipality), Užutrakis (near Trakai) and the most beautiful park in Lithuania, the Palanga Botanical Park. These parks have many distinctive features used by André in his parks: harmonious placement and pleasing arrangement of artificial grottoes, waterfalls, mountain-style stone structures, employment of natural water bodies and panoramas.

Édouard André succeeded Charles Antoine Lemaire as editor of L'Illustration Horticole in 1870.

He undertook a botanising trip in the foothills of the Andes in 1875–76 that resulted in the introduction of numerous hardy and tender plants new to European cultivation; his researches resulted in a volume on bromeliads, Bromeliaceae Andreanae. Description et Histoire des Bromeliacées récoltées dans la Colombie, l'Ecuador et la Venezuela, Librairie Agricole, Paris, 1889.
  
His pupil and assistant, Charles or Carlos Thays went to Buenos Aires in 1889 and was responsible for the planning of tree-lined boulevards and public gardens, resulting in the French atmosphere often noted in that city.

Édouard André died in La Croix-en-Touraine, and was interred in Montmartre Cemetery, Paris.

Bibliography

Bromeliaceae Andreanae. Description et Histoire des Bromeliacées, récoltées dans la Colombie, l'Ecuador et la Venezuela. Paris: Librairie Agricole, 1889. Nachdruck: Berkeley CA, USA: Big Bridge Press, 1983
L' art des jardins: traité général de la composition des parcs et jardins. Paris: Masson, 1879. Nachdruck: Marseille: Lafitte Reprints, 1983,

See also

Roseraie du Val-de-Marne

References

External links

 Palanga Botanical Park website
 About Sefton Park
 Weldham Castle website
 Roseraie du Val-de-Marne Website
 

1840 births
1911 deaths
People from Bourges
19th-century French people
French landscape and garden designers
French horticulturists
French garden writers
Burials at Montmartre Cemetery
French male non-fiction writers